Arthur Gordon Ferguson (18 July 1910 – 8 October 1969) was an Australian rules footballer who played for the Footscray Football Club in the Victorian Football League (VFL).

Notes

External links 
		

1910 births
1969 deaths
Australian rules footballers from Victoria (Australia)
Western Bulldogs players
Golden Point Football Club players